Tom Krantz (born 15 July 1971) is a Swedish sprint and marathon canoeist who competed in the mid-1990s. At the 1996 Summer Olympics, he was eliminated in the repechages of both the K-1 500 m and the K-1 1000 m events.

References
Sports-Reference.com profile

1971 births
Living people
Swedish male canoeists
Olympic canoeists of Sweden
Canoeists at the 1996 Summer Olympics
Medalists at the ICF Canoe Marathon World Championships